The 2008 World Series of Poker was the 39th annual World Series of Poker (WSOP).  Held in Las Vegas, Nevada at the Rio All Suite Hotel and Casino, the 2008 series began on May 30 and featured 55 poker championships in several variants.  All events but the $10,000 World Championship No Limit Texas hold 'em Main Event, the most prestigious of the WSOP events, ended by July 15.  The final table, known as the November Nine,  of the Main Event was suspended until November, to allow for better television coverage.  As a WSOP custom since 1976, each of the event winners received a championship bracelet in addition to that event's prize money ranging from US$87,929 for the $500 Casino Employees No-Limit Hold'em  to US$9,119,517 for the Main Event.

Most of the tournaments played at the WSOP are variants of Texas Hold 'em.  Hold 'em is a community card game where each player may use any combination of the five community cards and the player's own two hole cards to make a poker hand, in contrast to poker variants such as stud or draw in which each player holds a separate individual hand.  Between 2000 and 2009, hold'em has surpassed seven-card stud as the most common game in U.S. casinos, almost totally eclipsing the once popular game.  Seven-card stud is a poker variant wherein each player is dealt two hole card, followed by four face up cards, and then another hidden card, with betting after each round. Another poker variant played is Omaha.  Omaha is a version of poker wherein each player is dealt four hole cards and must use two of them in conjunction with three community cards to make the best possible five card hand.  Other games played at the 2008 tournament included Razz, HORSE, and Deuce-to-Seven.

Within each of these poker variants a myriad of options exist.  For example, depending on the betting structure, a tournament might be described as no limit, limit or pot-limit. Games may also include other variations on the rules governing the execution of the specific game such as shootout, eight or better, or heads up.

Highlights of the 2008 series include the selection of Erick Lindgren as the Player of the Year.  Before the 2008 WSOP, Lindgren, who won a bracelet and made three final tables,  was widely considered to be the "best player to never win a WSOP bracelet”.  Phil Hellmuth, a Poker Hall of Famer, set new records for the most WSOP career cashes (68) and most WSOP career final tables (41).   Nikolay Evdakov led all players with a record 10 money finishes.  The Main Event, which began with 6,844 participants (a level exceeded only by the number of participants at the 2006 event), was suspended once the event was down to the nine players needed for the final table; the Main Event was resumed on November 9 and concluded with the heads-up final between Peter Eastgate and Ivan Demidov the next day.  This year was the first in which the Main Event was suspended in this fashion, a change introduced at ESPN's request to allow the television network to do a same-day Main Event broadcast.

Key

Results

Event 1: $10,000 World Championship Pot-Limit Hold'em

 3-Day Event: Friday May 30, 2008 to Sunday June 1, 2008
 Number of Entries: 352
 Total Prize Pool: $
 Number of Payouts: 36
 Winning Hand: 
 References

Event 2: $1,500 No-Limit Hold'em

 4-Day Event: Saturday May 31, 2008 to Tuesday June 3, 2008
 Number of Entries: 3929
 Total Prize Pool: $
 Number of Payouts: 378
 Winning Hand: 
 Other: Broke the record for largest field in a tournament that was not the WSOP main event.
 References

Event 3: $1,500 Pot-Limit Hold'em

 3-Day Event: Monday June 2, 2008 to Wednesday June 4, 2008
 Number of Entries: 714
 Total Prize Pool: $
 Number of Payouts: 72
 Winning Hand: 
 References

Event 4: $5,000 Mixed Hold'em (Limit/No-Limit)

 3-Day Event: Monday June 2, 2008 to Wednesday June 4, 2008
 Number of Entries: 332
 Total Prize Pool: $
 Number of Payouts: 36
 Winning Hand:  
 References

Event 5: $1,000 No-Limit Hold'em with Rebuys

 3-Day Event: Tuesday June 3, 2008 to Thursday June 5, 2008
 Number of Entries: 766
 Number of Rebuys/Add-ons: 2,258
 Total Prize Pool: $
 Number of Payouts: 72
 Winning Hand: 
 References

Event 6: $1,500 Omaha Hi-Low Split-8 or Better

 3-Day Event: Tuesday June 3, 2008 to Thursday June 5, 2008
 Number of Entries: 833
 Total Prize Pool: $
 Number of Payouts: 81
 Winning Hand: 
 References

Event 7: $2,000 No-Limit Hold'em

 3-Day Event: Wednesday June 4, 2008 to Friday June 6, 2008
 Number of Entries: 1592
 Total Prize Pool: $
 Number of Payouts: 153
 Winning Hand:  
 References

Event 8: $10,000 World Championship Mixed Event

 3-Day Event: Wednesday June 4, 2008 to Friday June 6, 2008
 Number of Entries: 192
 Total Prize Pool: $
 Number of Payouts: 24
 Winning Hand:  (No-Limit Hold'em)
 References

Note: This event comprised eight poker variants played on a rotating format with one-hour long levels.  Every eight hands the game alternated in the following order: Limit Deuce-to-Seven Triple Draw, Limit Hold'em, Limit Omaha Hi-Low Split-8 or Better, Razz, Seven-Card Stud, Seven-Card Stud-8 or Better, No-Limit Hold'em, Pot-Limit Omaha.

Event 9: $1,500 No-Limit Hold'em (Six-Handed)

 3-Day Event: Thursday June 5, 2008 to Saturday June 7, 2008
 Number of Entries: 1,236
 Total Prize Pool: $
 Number of Payouts: 126
 Winning Hand: 
 References

Event 10: $2,500 Omaha/Seven-Card Stud Hi-Low Split-8 or Better

 3-Day Event: Thursday June 5, 2008 to Saturday June 7, 2008
 Number of Entries: 388
 Total Prize Pool: $
 Number of Payouts: 40
 Winning Hand: 
 References

Event 11: $5,000 No-Limit Hold'em Shootout

 3-Day Event: Friday June 6, 2008 to Sunday June 8, 2008
 Number of Entries: 360
 Total Prize Pool: $
 Number of Payouts: 36
 Winning Hand: 
 References

Event 12: $1,500 Limit Hold'em

 3-Day Event: Friday June 6, 2008 to Sunday June 8, 2008
 Number of Entries: 881
 Total Prize Pool: $
 Number of Payouts: 81 
 Winning Hand: 
 References

Event 13: $2,500 No-Limit Hold'em

 3-Day Event: Saturday June 7, 2008 to Monday June 9, 2008
 Number of Entries: 1,397
 Total Prize Pool: $
 Number of Payouts: 99
 Winning Hand: 
 References

Event 14: $10,000 World Championship Seven-Card Stud

 3-Day Event: Saturday June 7, 2008 to Monday June 9, 2008
 Number of Entries: 158
 Total Prize Pool: $
 Number of Payouts: 16
 Winning Hand: 
 References

Event 15: $1,000 Ladies No-Limit Hold'em World Championship

 3-Day Event: Sunday June 8, 2008 to Tuesday June 10, 2008
 Number of Entries: 1,190
 Total Prize Pool: $
 Number of Payouts: 99
 Winning Hand: 
 References

Event 16: $2,000 Omaha Hi-Low Split-8 or Better

 3-Day Event: Sunday June 8, 2008 to Tuesday June 10, 2008
 Number of Entries: 553
 Total Prize Pool: $
 Number of Payouts: 54
 Winning Hand:  
 References

Event 17: $1,500 No-Limit Hold'em Shootout

 2-Day Event: Monday June 9, 2008 to Tuesday June 10, 2008
 Number of Entries: 1,000
 Total Prize Pool: $
 Number of Payouts: 100
 Winning Hand: 
 References

Event 18: $5,000 No-Limit Deuce-to-Seven Draw Lowball with Rebuys

 3-Day Event: Monday June 9, 2008 to Wednesday June 11, 2008
 Number of Entries: 85
 Number of Rebuys/Add-ons: 272
 Total Prize Pool: $
 Number of Payouts: 14
 Winning Hand: 
 References

Event 19: $1,500 Pot-Limit Omaha

 3-Day Event: Tuesday June 10, 2008 to Thursday June 12, 2008
 Number of Entries: 759
 Total Prize Pool: $
 Number of Payouts: 72
 Winning Hand: 
 References

Event 20: $2,000 Limit Hold'em

 3-Day Event: Tuesday June 10, 2008 to Thursday June 12, 2008
 Number of Entries: 480
 Total Prize Pool: $
 Number of Payouts: 45
 Winning Hand: 
 References

Event 21: $5,000 No-Limit Hold'em

 3-Day Event: Wednesday June 11, 2008 to Friday June 13, 2008
 Number of Entries: 731
 Total Prize Pool: $
 Number of Payouts: 72
 Winning Hand: 
 References

Event 22: $3,000 H.O.R.S.E.

 3-Day Event: Wednesday June 11, 2008 to Friday June 13, 2008
 Number of Entries: 414
 Total Prize Pool: $
 Number of Payouts: 40
 Winning Hand:  (Stud) 
 References

Event 23: $2,000 No-Limit Hold'em

 3-Day Event: Thursday June 12, 2008 to Saturday June 14, 2008
 Number of Entries: 1,344
 Total Prize Pool: $
 Number of Payouts: 99
 Winning Hand: 
 References

Event 24: $2,500 Pot-Limit Hold'em/Omaha

 3-Day Event: Thursday June 12, 2008 to Saturday June 14, 2008
 Number of Entries: 457
 Total Prize Pool: $
 Number of Payouts: 45
 Winning Hand: 
 References

Event 25: $10,000 World Championship Heads Up No-Limit Hold'em

 3-Day Event: Friday June 13, 2008 to Sunday June 15, 2008
 Number of Entries: 256
 Total Prize Pool: $
 Number of Payouts: 64
 Winning Hand: 
 References

Event 26: $1,500 Razz

 3-Day Event: Friday June 13, 2008 to Sunday June 15, 2008
 Number of Entries: 453
 Total Prize Pool: $
 Number of Payouts: 48
 Winning Hand: J-9-7-4-A-9-4
 References

Event 27: $1,500 No-Limit Hold'em

 3-Day Event: Saturday June 14, 2008 to Monday June 16, 2008
 Number of Entries: 2,706
 Total Prize Pool: $
 Number of Payouts: 270
 Winning Hand:  
 References

Event 28: $5,000 Pot-Limit Omaha with Rebuys

 3-Day Event: Saturday June 14, 2008 to Monday June 16, 2008
 Number of Entries: 152
 Number of Rebuys/Add-ons: 483
 Total Prize Pool: $
 Number of Payouts: 18
 Winning Hand:  
 References

Event 29: $3,000 No-Limit Hold'em

 3-Day Event: Sunday June 15, 2008 to Tuesday June 17, 2008
 Number of Entries: 716
 Total Prize Pool: $
 Number of Payouts: 72
 Winning Hand: 
 References

Event 30: $10,000 World Championship Limit Hold'em

 3-Day Event: Sunday June 15, 2008 to Tuesday June 17, 2008
 Number of Entries: 218
 Total Prize Pool: $
 Number of Payouts: 27
 Winning Hand: 
 References

Event 31: $2,500 No-Limit Hold'em (Six-Handed)

 3-Day Event: Monday June 16, 2008 to Wednesday June 18, 2008
 Number of Entries: 1,012
 Total Prize Pool: $
 Number of Payouts: 108
 Winning Hand:  
 References

Event 32: $1,500 No-Limit Hold'em

 3-Day Event: Tuesday June 17, 2008 to Thursday June 19, 2008
 Number of Entries: 2,304
 Total Prize Pool: $
 Number of Payouts: 198
 Winning Hand: 
 References

Event 33: $5,000 World Championship Seven-Card Stud Hi-Low Split-8 or Better

 3-Day Event: Tuesday June 17, 2008 to Thursday June 19, 2008
 Number of Entries: 261
 Total Prize Pool: $
 Number of Payouts: 24
 Winning Hand:  (two-pair no low)
 References

Event 34: $1,500 Pot-Limit Omaha w/Rebuys

 3-Day Event: Wednesday June 18, 2008 to Friday June 20, 2008
 Number of Entries: 320
 Number of Rebuys/Add-ons: 1,350
 Total Prize Pool: $
 Number of Payouts: 36
 Winning Hand: 
 References Event 35: $1,500 Seven-Card Stud

 3-Day Event: Wednesday June 18, 2008 to Friday June 20, 2008
 Number of Entries: 381
 Total Prize Pool: $
 Number of Payouts: 40
 Winning Hand: 
 References Event 36: $1,500 No-Limit Hold'em

 3-Day Event: Thursday June 19, 2008 to Saturday June 21, 2008
 Number of Entries: 2,447
 Total Prize Pool: $
 Number of Payouts: 198
 Winning Hand: 
 References Event 37: $10,000 World Championship Omaha Hi-Low Split-8 or Better

 3-Day Event: Thursday June 19, 2008 to Saturday June 21, 2008
 Number of Entries: 235
 Total Prize Pool: $
 Number of Payouts: 27
 Winning Hand: 
 References Event 38: $2,000 Pot-Limit Hold'em

 3-Day Event: Friday June 20, 2008 to Sunday June 22, 2008
 Number of Entries: 605
 Total Prize Pool: $
 Number of Payouts: 63
 Winning Hand: 
 References Event 39: $1,500 No-Limit Hold'em

 3-Day Event: Saturday June 21, 2008 to Monday June 23, 2008
 Number of Entries: 2,720
 Total Prize Pool: $
 Number of Payouts: 270
 Winning Hand: 
 References Event 40: $2,500 Limit Deuce-to-Seven Triple Draw

 3-Day Event: Sunday June 22, 2008 to Tuesday June 24, 2008
 Number of Entries: 238
 Total Prize Pool: $
 Number of Payouts: 24
 Winning Hand: 
 References Event 41: $1,500 Mixed Hold'em (Limit/No-Limit)

 3-Day Event: Sunday June 22, 2008 to Tuesday June 24, 2008
 Number of Entries: 731
 Total Prize Pool: $
 Number of Payouts: 72
 Winning Hand: 	
 References Event 42: $1,000 Seniors No-Limit Hold'em World Championship

 3-Day Event: Monday June 23, 2008 to Wednesday June 25, 2008
 Number of Entries: 2,218
 Total Prize Pool: $
 Number of Payouts: 198
 Winning Hand: 
 References Event 43: $1,500 Pot-Limit Omaha Hi-Low Split-8 or Better

 3-Day Event: Tuesday June 24, 2008 to Thursday June 26, 2008
 Number of Entries: 720
 Total Prize Pool: $
 Number of Payouts: 72
 Winning Hand: 
 References Event 44: $1,000 No-Limit Hold'em w/Rebuys

 3-Day Event: Wednesday June 25, 2008 to Friday June 27, 2008
 Number of Entries: 879
 Number of Rebuys/Add-ons: 2,508
 Total Prize Pool: $
 Number of Payouts: 81
 Winning Hand: 
 References Event 45: $50,000 World Championship H.O.R.S.E.

 5-Day Event: Wednesday June 25, 2008 to Sunday June 29, 2008
 Number of Entries: 148
 Total Prize Pool: $
 Number of Payouts: 16
 Winning Hand:  (Hold'em)
 References Event 46: $5,000 No-Limit Hold'em (Six-Handed)

 3-Day Event: Thursday June 26, 2008 to Saturday June 28, 2008
 Number of Entries: 805
 Total Prize Pool: $
 Number of Payouts: 78
 Winning Hand: 
 References Event 47: $1,500 Seven-Card Stud Hi-Low Split-8 or Better

 3-Day Event: Thursday June 26, 2008 to Saturday June 28, 2008
 Number of Entries: 544
 Total Prize Pool: $
 Number of Payouts: 56
 Winning Hand: 
 References Event 48: $2,000 No-Limit Hold'em

 3-Day Event: Friday June 27, 2008 to Sunday June 29, 2008
 Number of Entries: 2,317
 Total Prize Pool: $
 Number of Payouts: 198
 Winning Hand: 
 Other: Nikolay Evdakov sets new record for most WSOP cashes in a single year with nine.
 Other: Alexandre Gomes becomes the first WSOP bracelet winner from South America.
 References Event 49: $1,500 No-Limit Hold'em

 3-Day Event: Saturday June 28, 2008 to Monday June 30, 2008
 Number of Entries: 2,718
 Total Prize Pool: $
 Number of Payouts: 270
 Winning Hand: 
 References Event 50: $10,000 World Championship Pot-Limit Omaha

 3-Day Event: Sunday June 29, 2008 to Tuesday July 1, 2008
 Number of Entries: 381
 Total Prize Pool: $
 Number of Payouts: 36
 Winning Hand: 
 Other: Nikolay Evdakov extends his single-year record for WSOP cashes with 10.
 References Event 51: $1,500 H.O.R.S.E.

 3-Day Event: Sunday June 29, 2008 to Tuesday July 1, 2008
 Number of Entries: 803
 Total Prize Pool: $
 Number of Payouts: 80
 Winning Hand:  (Stud-8)
 References Event 52: $1,500 No-Limit Hold'em

 3-Day Event: Monday June 30, 2008 to Wednesday July 2, 2008
 Number of Entries: 2,693
 Total Prize Pool: $
 Number of Payouts: 270
 Winning Hand: 
 References Event 53: $1,500 Limit Hold'em Shootout

 2-Day Event: Tuesday July 1, 2008 to Wednesday July 2, 2008
 Number of Entries: 823
 Total Prize Pool: $
 Number of Payouts: 90
 Winning Hand: 
 References Event 54: $10,000 World Championship No-Limit Hold'em

 12-Day Event: Thursday July 3, 2008 to Monday July 14, 2008
 Final Table: Sunday November 9, 2008 to Monday November 10, 2008
 Number of Entries: 6,844
 Total Prize Pool: $
 Number of Payouts: 666
 Winning Hand: 
 References Event 55: $500 Casino Employees No-Limit Hold'em

 2-Day Event: Monday July 7, 2008 to Tuesday July 8, 2008
 Number of Entries: 930
 Total Prize Pool: $
 Number of Payouts: 90
 Winning Hand: unknown
 References'''

References

World Series of Poker
2008 in poker